The White List (Russian: Белый список, translit. Beliy Spisok) is an upcoming Russian police procedural drama directed by Alisa Khazanova from the script by Roman Volobuev and starring Alexey Serebryakov. The film is loosely based on the events surrounding the police investigation of Blue Whale Challenge controversy in 2016.

Plot 
In the midst of a nationwide moral panic caused by a newspaper article linking a recent spike in teenage suicides across Russia to a viral 'suicide game' two federal investigators are sent to a small Russian town of Podolsk to review a cold case involving a suspicious death of a schoolgirl. Initially seeing their task as a mere PR stunt both gradually start to lose their focus as they venture deeper into the paranoid world of conspiracy theories surrounding the case.

Cast 

 Alexey Serebryakov as Korotkov
 Vladimir Averyanov as Lazarev
 Victoria Kregzde as Melinikova
 Anastasia Krasovskaya as Ira

References

External links 

 

2020s Russian-language films
Russian crime drama films
Russian mystery films
Crime films based on actual events
Films set in Saint Petersburg
Films shot in Saint Petersburg
Neo-noir
Upcoming Russian-language films